Amirdovlat Amasiatsi (-1496), also called Amirdovlat of Amasia, was a 15th-century Armenian physician and writer. He wrote several works on medicine and science, some aimed at professional audiences and some at ordinary people. All his works were written in Middle Armenian, making them accessible to ordinary readers and not just to scholars.

Amirdovlat was born in Amasia around 1420. He travelled extensively. He wrote the majority of his works in Constantinople, where he was chief physician to Mehmed II.

He died in Amasia or Bursa on December 8, 1496.

Chronology
In Amirdovlat's biography, Vardanyan  gives the following chronology of his life:

Between 1420 and 1430: born in Amasia

1450s: Attended Armenian schools in Amasia and Sebastia. Wandered as a travelling physician in Asia and Iran collecting plant samples

End of 1450s: Moved to Constantinople by sea. Further studies of medicinal arts, natural sciences and philosophy.

1460s: Selected as a chief physician to Mehmed II, and received an honorary title of chief physician-ophthalmologist. Afterwards he had ten years of exile and wanderings around Balkan countries.

1470s: Returned to Constantinople, regained his position of a chief physician to Mehmed II, enjoying his confidence until the ruler's death in 1481.

1480s: Returned to his motherland upon the invitation of the son of Mehmed II, Ahmed, who became a ruler of Amasia.

1490: Journeyed to the city of Bursa for treatment with mineral waters.

1496, December 8: Died in Amasia (though other sources suggest Bursa).

Main works
Vardanyan also lists his major works:

1459: The Lore of Medicine and the first Akhrabadin (an extensive work on pharmacology), manuscript 8871 in the Matenadaran in Yerevan, Armenia

1466—1469: His major work on clinical medicine, The Benefits of Medicine, written in the city of Phillipopolis, now Plovdiv, in Bulgaria.

1474: Folk Medicine, with elements of magic medicine and astrology.

1481: The second Akhrabadin.

1478-1492: Useless for Ignoramuses, his major compendium of over 3000 plants and plant names, with their medical uses.

See also
 Şerafeddin Sabuncuoğlu

References

External links
 
 Encyclopædia Iranica online: 

1496 deaths
Medieval Armenian physicians
Armenians from the Ottoman Empire
Year of birth uncertain
People from Amasya
15th-century physicians
15th-century Armenian writers
Court physicians
Physicians of the medieval Islamic world
Christians from the Ottoman Empire
Christians in the medieval Islamic world